The Preiļupe is a stream in Latvia (Latgale) in Riebinu, Preiļu and Vārkava counties. Its source is Salmejs Lake, from which it flows westward, through the city of Preili, and then into the Feimanka in the area of Škilteri. Its estimated terrain elevation above sea level is 124 metres.

External links
 Preiļupe in getamap.net
 Preiļupe in geographic.org
 Preiļupe (as Prelka) in Geographical Dictionary of the Kingdom of Poland (in Polish), vol. XV part 2, page 515

Rivers of Latvia